Moving Heroes is a pop-rock group based in Hamburg. Dieter Bohlen is the band's executive producer and his team participated in the recording of their songs. Their debut album Golden Times went gold.

History
The story of Moving Heroes goes back to 1998 when cousins Elan and Jenier were 12 years old and decided to start a band. As teenagers, they would play during school events and at parties, mostly their songs with some rare covers.

Jenier began writing songs aged 11 and they formed the basis of their repertoire. While playing in different clubs and earning money for the first time the group went by the name of Number One.

Once, while participating in a music contest, the band received an invitation from one of the jury members to record a couple of their songs in a professional studio.

From this moment the band began trying to find their style and recognizable sound. Since the age of 15 and to the present, working in any studio, Elan and Jenier have always participated directly in mixing all their songs. Sometime later they found their way into one of the best studios in Hamburg (Joe Park Studio), where they began working on their first album together with German Music Production.

It was then that they met Dieter Bohlen, who, realizing the band's artistic potential and self-sufficiency, began working with them as executive producer. This was the first time that Dieter Bohlen had ever worked with musicians without being himself one of the songwriters. All the songs on every album are written by Jenier. In 2006 the group changed its name to Moving Heroes. The idea came after listening to the legendary song of Queen – "The Show Must Go On".

Their debut album Golden Times was released on June 1, 2007, and went on to become Gold. Two songs from the album – "You are my Angel and my Devil" and "Not Good Enough" were released as singles.

These releases were followed by many concerts and appearances at large music festivals. In October 2008, Moving Heroes signed a record deal with Sony BMG. Soon thereafter the label was restructured into Sony Music Entertainment. The change in CEO and top management led to a delay in the release of the band's next album.

Born to Win, their second studio album was released on November 23, 2009, and went Gold as well. The single "Crazy" from that album remains the group's biggest hit. The song "Life Is Hard" was also released as a single.

In 2010 the DVD Moving Heroes Presents was released accompanied by a wide tour to promote the album. On October 27, 2011, they played a large, successful, one-off show at the Ice Palace in St. Petersburg. 
In 2011 the single "Angel's Dream" was released.

Their collaboration with Dieter Bohlen went on to make concert history: after a ten-year absence, he performed onstage in a solo concert together with Moving Heroes. On October 17, 2012, they played live together at the Oktyabrsky Grand Concert Hall in St. Petersburg in a show that lasted over two hours.

The group continued to work on their third album and in 2012 they released the single "Danger Angel" which contains a book of photographs and the new song "Dangerous and Real" in 2013 the DVD for Live Concert at Ice Palace Arena was released.

In June 2013, on the band's birthday, their fans presented Elan and Jenier with an unusual gift. They named a star  'Moving heroes' in the Orion constellation.

On 4th April 2014, the band released a new Single called "Shadow".

Members
Elan Alden – lead vocals
Jenier Belous – music, lyrics, back vocals

Discography

CD
 2007 Golden Times
 2009 Crazy (Single)
 2009 Born To Win
 2010 Life Is Hard (Single)
 2012 Danger! Angel... (Single)
 2014 Shadow (Single)
 2015 Dirty Dancing (Single)

DVD
 2010 Moving Heroes TV Presents
 2013 Concert at Ice Palace Arena Live 27.10.2011

Digital
 2011 Angel's Dream (Single)
 2011 Dangerous And Real (Single)
 2018 Dirty Dancing (Single)

Videography 

 2007 You Are My Angel And My Devil
 2009 Crazy
 2009 Crazy Remake
 2009 You Are My Angel And My Devil New Version
 2010 Life Is Hard
 2010 Country Of The Sun
 2011 Angel's Dream
 2012 Dangerous And Real
 2017 Alien
 2018 Dirty Dancing

The list of official clips may be different in other sources. There are lot of videos of reports, interviews and live shows published at the Official YouTube Channel.

References

External links
 Official Web Site
 Moving Heroes discography at Discogs
 Official YouTube Channel

German pop music groups
German musical duos
Pop music duos
Female musical duos